Aloeides argenteus, the silvery copper, is a butterfly in the family Lycaenidae. It is found in Namibia. It is only known from an arid area just inland of the coastal dunes.

References

Butterflies described in 1994
Aloeides
Endemic fauna of Namibia
Butterflies of Africa